Ulrike Schümann (born 30 January 1973) is a German sailor. She competed in the Yngling event at the 2008 Summer Olympics.

References

External links
 

1973 births
Living people
German female sailors (sport)
Olympic sailors of Germany
Sailors at the 2008 Summer Olympics – Yngling
Sportspeople from Potsdam